"People and Places" is a song written by French composer Eric Lévi, American singer Philip Bailey, and American songwriter Roxanne Seeman for the French film La Vengeance d'une Blonde. It is the end-credit song for the #1 French box office film starring Christian Clavier and starring Christian Clavier and Marie-Anne Chazel and scored by Levi. The song was recorded as a duet between Dee Dee Bridgewater and Philip Bailey and released as a single and 12" club mix by BMG France in 1994. The single, club mix, and instrumental versions appear on the soundtrack album. The single version was included as a bonus track on the Japanese release of Philip Bailey's solo album Philip Bailey.

Background 

Levi met Roxanne Seeman at the Warner/Chappell Music Paris office.  After scoring Les Visiteurs and while working on his score for La Vengeance d'une Blonde Levi proposed writing a song with Seeman and Philip Bailey for the film.

Recording 

The recording of "People and Places" took place in Paris with Eric Lévi on keyboards and Philippe Manca on guitar. The vocals were recorded as a duet between Philip Bailey and Dee Dee Bridgewater, with Philip Bailey recording vocals in Los Angeles and Dee Dee Bridgewater recording her vocals in Paris. The final mix was at Studio Mega.

Credits and personnel 

 Eric Levi – producer
 Philip Bailey – lead vocal
 Dee Dee Bridgewater – lead vocal
 Philippe Manca –guitars
 Studio Mega – recording studio, Paris

References

External links 

Songs written for films
Songs written by Philip Bailey
Songs written by Roxanne Seeman
1994 songs
Philip Bailey songs
Male–female vocal duets
1994 singles